Daryl Perkins (born 20 April 1943) is a former Australian professional track cyclist.

Biography
Perkins was born and lives in the state of Victoria, Australia. He was a sprint, tandem and six-day rider.

Perkins teamed with Ian Browne to win the tandem sprint at the Australian National Track Championships. That qualified them to compete at the 1964 Summer Olympics in Tokyo. They were knocked out of the tandem sprint in the quarter final by the Soviet Union and came fifth.

In 1966, Perkins won the bronze medal in the 1000m sprint at the British Empire and Commonwealth Games in Kingston, Jamaica, finishing behind Roger Gibbon and Jim Booker.

Perkins took over a hotel in Ararat in 2004. He is also involved in Derny piloting and is a commissaire.

He is the father of track cyclist Shane Perkins.

During 2018 Six Days of Berlin, he flew to watch his son Shane race and was infected with Meningococcal meningitis, which can cause permanent disabilities or even death. A GoFundMe fundraising campaign organized by Six Day Series exceeded its target of 20,000 euros due to the support of the German public. He was cured after 6 weeks, then returning to Australia for further recovery. Shane Perkins was grateful for the reception and raced again in the 2019 Six Days of Berlin.

References

1943 births
Living people
Australian track cyclists
Australian male cyclists
Cyclists at the 1964 Summer Olympics
Olympic cyclists of Australia
Commonwealth Games bronze medallists for Australia
Cyclists at the 1966 British Empire and Commonwealth Games
Australian cycling coaches
Cyclists from Victoria (Australia)
Commonwealth Games medallists in cycling
Cyclists at the 1970 British Commonwealth Games
20th-century Australian people
21st-century Australian people
Sportsmen from Victoria (Australia)
Medallists at the 1966 British Empire and Commonwealth Games